Sheldon Whitehouse (born October 20, 1955) is an American lawyer and politician serving as the junior United States senator from Rhode Island since 2007. A member of the Democratic Party, he served as a United States Attorney from 1993 to 1998 and the 71st attorney general of Rhode Island from 1999 to 2003.

Early life and education
Whitehouse was born on October 20, 1955, in New York City, the son of Mary Celine (née Rand) and career diplomat Charles Sheldon Whitehouse, and grandson of diplomat Edwin Sheldon Whitehouse (1883–1965). Among his great-great-grandfathers were Episcopalian bishop Henry John Whitehouse and railroad magnate Charles Crocker, who was among the founders of the Central Pacific Railroad. Whitehouse graduated from St. Paul's School in Concord, New Hampshire, and from Yale College in 1978. He received his Juris Doctor (J.D.) from the University of Virginia School of Law in 1982.

Early career
Whitehouse worked as a clerk for Justice Richard Neely of the Supreme Court of Appeals of West Virginia from 1982 to 1983. He also worked in the Rhode Island Attorney General's office as a special assistant attorney general from 1985 to 1990, chief of the Regulatory Unit (which oversaw utilities) from 1988 to 1990, and as an assistant attorney general from 1989 to 1990.

Whitehouse worked as Rhode Island Governor Bruce Sundlun's Executive Counsel beginning in 1991, and was later tapped to serve as Director of Policy. He oversaw the state's response to the Rhode Island banking crisis that took place soon after Sundlun took office. In 1992 Sundlun appointed Whitehouse the state's Director of Business Regulation, where he oversaw a drastic reform in the state's workers' compensation insurance system.

Early political career

U.S. attorney
President Bill Clinton appointed Whitehouse United States Attorney for Rhode Island in 1994. Whitehouse held the position for four years. With the 1996 extortion conviction of mobster Gerard Ouimette, he was the first prosecutor to convict a member of organized crime under Clinton's "three strikes law". Whitehouse also initiated the investigation into municipal corruption in Rhode Island that led to Operation Plunder Dome, in which Mayor of Providence Vincent "Buddy" Cianci was eventually convicted on conspiracy charges. As U.S. Attorney for Rhode Island, Whitehouse oversaw an increase in environmental protection efforts, including an investigation into a Narragansett Bay oil spill that yielded the largest fine in state history.

State attorney general
In 1998, Whitehouse was elected Rhode Island attorney general. He initiated a lawsuit against the lead paint industry that ended in a mistrial; the state later won a second lawsuit against former lead paint manufacturers Sherwin-Williams, Millennium Holdings, and NL Industries that found them responsible for creating a public nuisance. This decision, however, was unanimously overturned by the Rhode Island Supreme Court on July 1, 2008. The Court found that under Rhode Island law it is the responsibility of property owners to abate and mitigate lead hazards.

Whitehouse also founded the Rhode Island Quality Institute, "an organization dedicated to improving health care quality in the State of Rhode Island". He authorized the first Rhode Island State Police wiretap to investigate public corruption.

When black Providence police officer Cornel Young Jr. was shot and killed by two fellow officers while he was off-duty in January 2000, Whitehouse was criticized for not appointing an independent prosecutor to investigate the shooting. Later that year, Whitehouse was criticized when 15-year-old Jennifer Rivera, a witness in a murder case, was shot by a relative of the man she was to testify against later that year. After Rivera's shooting, Whitehouse strengthened the state's witness protection program.

2002 gubernatorial election

Whitehouse ran for the Democratic nomination for governor of Rhode Island in 2002. He lost the primary election to former State Senator Myrth York, who was unsuccessful in the general election against Republican Donald Carcieri.

U.S. Senate

Elections

2006 

In 2006, Whitehouse ran for the seat occupied by Senator Lincoln Chafee, a Republican seeking a second full term. After winning the Democratic primary by a large margin, Whitehouse went on to defeat Chafee with 53 percent of the vote.

2012 

On November 6, 2012, Whitehouse won reelection to a second term in office, easily defeating Republican challenger Barry Hinckley, "both in state results and in local towns. Whitehouse won by 30 points, with 64.9 percent of the vote in Rhode Island".

2018 

On November 6, 2018, Whitehouse was reelected to a third term, defeating Republican Robert Flanders by 23 points.

Tenure

In 2007, the National Journal ranked Whitehouse the second-most liberal senator.

He voted to confirm Elena Kagan and Sonia Sotomayor to the Supreme Court.

In the spring of 2007, Whitehouse joined other senators in calling for Attorney General Alberto Gonzales's resignation. After Gonzales's first appearance before the Senate Judiciary Committee related to the controversy, Whitehouse told NPR, "[Gonzales] had a hard sell to make to me, and he didn't make it." He continued to question Gonzales's service in the NSA warrantless surveillance controversy.

Whitehouse has faced some criticism for alleged insider trading, avoiding big losses by trading stocks after top federal officials warned congressional leaders of "the coming economic cataclysm" in September 2008.

PolitiFact determined that Whitehouse falsely claimed Paul Ryan's 2012 budget blueprint "gets rid of Medicare in 10 years." Whitehouse claimed to have meant that Ryan's plan would have ended Medicare "as we know it", turning it into a voucher program.

Upon Attorney General Eric Holder's announcement in September 2014 of his intention to step down, some speculated that Whitehouse could be nominated as Holder's replacement.

In February 2016, after the death of U.S. Supreme Court Associate Justice Antonin Scalia, USA Today named Whitehouse as a possible nominee to fill the vacancy. Whitehouse's service as a U.S. Attorney and as Attorney General of Rhode Island gives him both legislative experience and experience as a legal official, though not as a judge. Whitehouse was ultimately not nominated.

In March 2022, Business Insider reported that Whitehouse had violated the STOCK Act, which is designed to combat insider trading, by failing to disclose two personal stock purchases by the federal deadline. The stocks in question were for the Target Corporation and Tesla, Inc. Whitehouse's office acknowledged that he missed the disclosure deadline, blaming it on a staff transition in his office.

Committee assignments
Sources:
 Committee on Budget (Chair)
 Committee on Environment and Public Works
 Subcommittee on Oversight
 Subcommittee on Superfund, Toxics and Environmental Health
 Subcommittee on Water and Wildlife (Ranking Member)
 Committee on Finance
 Committee on the Judiciary
United States Senate Caucus on International Narcotics Control (Chair)
 Commission on Security and Cooperation in Europe

Caucus memberships
 Healthy Kids Caucus
 International Conservation Caucus (Co-Chair)
 Senate Oceans Caucus (Co-Chair)
Afterschool Caucuses

Political positions

Criminal justice
Despite a generally pro-rehabilitation stance on crime, Whitehouse supports federal use of the death penalty, but opposes its use at the state level in Rhode Island. He supports gun control and has spoken out against the Patriot Act.

D.C. statehood
In a 2018 interview with the Providence Journal, Whitehouse expressed opposition to D.C. statehood. He was dismissive of efforts to give District residents representation in Congress, suggesting they should be satisfied with the amount of federal activity nearby. But in July 2020, he cosponsored a Senate bill to grant D.C. statehood.

Economics
Whitehouse supports a more progressive tax system and strongly opposed the Bush tax cuts and proposals to repeal the estate tax and the Alternative Minimum Tax. He voted for the Budget Control Act and against Cut, Cap and Balance and the debt ceiling increase. Earlier in his first term, Whitehouse voted for the Stimulus package and the TARP.

Whitehouse also opposed the North American Free Trade Agreement and other similar proposals, styling himself as a supporter of fair trade and opposing the use of presidential authority to "fast-track" normalized trade relations.

Environmental issues
In November 2011, Whitehouse introduced the Safeguarding America's Future and Environment (SAFE) Act, a bill that would require federal natural resource agencies to be concerned with the long-term effects of climate change, encourage states to prepare natural resource adaptation plans, and "create a science advisory board to ensure that the planning uses the best available science".

Whitehouse voted against cap and trade, but sponsored Offshoring Prevention and supported the Global Warming Reduction Act.

Of a proposed action on mandatory emissions curbs, Whitehouse told The Hill, "I am not hearing anybody on our side, even the people who are more economically concerned about the climate legislation who come from coal states, that sort of thing, saying, 'What are we going to say about this, is this a problem?'"

Whitehouse dismissed the Climatic Research Unit conspiracy theory: "Climategate should properly be known as Climategate-gate because it was the scandal that was phony."

The Environmental Defense Fund praised him for working to protect the Gulf Coast wetlands.

Whitehouse has said that the development of alternate energy sources, including solar power, will eliminate U.S. dependence on foreign oil. He has cited the installation of new solar panels on three new bank branches in Rhode Island, saying that the projects "created jobs, they put people to work, they lowered the cost for these banks of their electrical energy, and they get us off foreign oil and away, step by step, from these foreign entanglements that we have to get into to defend our oil supply". PolitiFact investigated the economics of renewable energy and determined that solar and wind investments would not have a large effect on oil consumption, calling Whitehouse's comments "mostly false" due to "this misimpression—and because of the other inaccuracies in Whitehouse's speech".

In a May 29, 2015, Washington Post editorial, Whitehouse advocated prosecution of members of the fossil fuel industry under the Racketeer Influenced and Corrupt Organizations Act (RICO), in order to investigate their interest in anti-global-warming advocacy.

In April 2019, Whitehouse was one of 12 senators to sign a bipartisan letter to top senators on the Appropriations Subcommittee on Energy and Water Development advocating that the Energy Department be granted maximum funding for carbon capture, utilization and storage (CCUS), arguing that American job growth could be stimulated by investment in capturing carbon emissions and expressing disagreement with President Trump's 2020 budget request to combine the two federal programs that do carbon capture research.

Since 2012, Whitehouse has spoken on the Senate floor about climate change every week the Senate has been in session, giving his 250th speech on the issue on July 24, 2019.

Foreign policy
Whitehouse opposed intervention in Iraq. He supported introducing a timetable for withdrawal from Iraq, saying that the U.S. must use caution in the future and avoid engaging in military action in Iran. Whitehouse supported a vote that would limit continuing U.S. support for the War in Yemen. Initially, he was one of the two Democratic holdouts in the Senate, but an activist effort, including mobilizing fans of the Rhode Island band Downtown Boys, contributed to changing his position.

Gun Control
Whitehouse is a supporter of gun control legislation.

Health care
Whitehouse supports stem cell research, abortion rights, and affirmative action. He voted for the Patient Protection and Affordable Care Act. During its passage, Whitehouse cautioned that conservative opposition to the bill was moving toward historical instances of mob violence, saying, "Too many colleagues are embarked on a desperate, no-holds-barred mission of propaganda, obstruction and fear. History cautions us of the excesses to which these malignant, vindictive passions can ultimately lead. Tumbrils have rolled through taunting crowds. Broken glass has sparkled in darkened streets. Strange fruit has hung from southern trees".

In December 2009, Whitehouse said "birthers", "fanatics", and "people running around in right-wing militia and Aryan support groups" opposed Obamacare.

LGBTQ rights
Whitehouse supports LGBTQ rights. In September 2014, he was one of 69 members of Congress to sign a letter to then-FDA commissioner Sylvia Burwell requesting that the FDA revise its policy banning donation of corneas and other tissues by men who have had sex with another man in the preceding five years. He has publicly supported reintroducing the Equal Rights Amendment.

Political spending
Whitehouse has been a staunch critic of so-called "dark money": political spending by nonprofit organizations that are not required to disclose their donors. He initially focused his criticism on conservative "dark money", but in 2020, as undisclosed political spending on the left significantly exceeded undisclosed political spending on the right, he said this type of spending was a problem on "both sides."

In May 2019, Whitehouse spoke about "the dangers of 'dark money' groups funding Congress" at an event funded by the Center for American Progress (CAP) and the American Constitution Society, both groups that have received funding from dark money organizations.

Whitehouse and Senator Richard Blumenthal submitted an amici brief in Janus v. AFSCME, a U.S. Supreme Court case about the power of labor unions to collect fees from non-union members. They urged the Court to uphold the right of public sector unions to collect dues from non-members. Whitehouse expressed concern that the conservative Bradley Foundation had funded multiple organizations involved in the case and that none of those groups had disclosed that funding.

Whitehouse has received over $175,000 in campaign donations from the League of Conservation Voters. He has close ties to billionaire Tom Steyer, who has donated $17,300 to Whitehouse since 2006. Other donors to Whitehouse include the Sierra Club and the Natural Resources Defense Council.

In March 2021, Whitehouse convened a Senate Judiciary subcommittee hearing titled "What's Wrong with the Supreme Court: The Big-Money Assault on Our Judiciary." He alleged that a "multi-hundred million dollar covert operation" influences the U.S. Supreme Court.

Also in March 2021, Whitehouse wrote U.S. Attorney General Merrick Garland a letter asking him to investigate "what appears to have been a politically constrained and perhaps fake FBI investigation into alleged misconduct by now-Supreme Court Justice Brett Kavanaugh." Senator Ben Sasse critiqued Whitehouse's allegation that the FBI investigation of Kavanaugh had been "fake", saying "This kind of paranoid obsession is Nixonian poison to public trust."

Electoral history

Publications 

 Captured: the Corporate Infiltration of American Democracy. Sheldon Whitehouse, Melanie Wachtell Stinnett. New Press, New York, 2019  
 The Scheme: How the Right Wing Used Dark Money to Capture the Supreme Court. Sheldon Whitehouse, Jennifer Mueller. New Press, New York, Oct. 2022.

Personal life
In 1986, Whitehouse married Sandra Thornton, a marine biologist and granddaughter of James Worth Thornton and Elena Mumm Thornton Wilson. Her step-grandfather was prominent essayist and critic Edmund Wilson. They live in Rhode Island with their two children. Whitehouse is Episcopalian.

Among Whitehouse's distant ancestors are William Bradford, governor of Plymouth Colony, and theologian Archibald Alexander.

After meeting with Federal Reserve Chairman Ben Bernanke and Treasury Secretary Henry Paulson in September 2008, Whitehouse came under scrutiny due to possible insider trading, when he sold a number of positions, valued at least at $250,000, over the next six days. A spokesperson for his office said that Whitehouse "is not actively involved in the management" of the implicated accounts, and that he "neither directed his financial advisor to undertake any transaction during that time, nor ever took advantage of any exclusive or secret information".

Membership in Bailey's Beach Club
Whitehouse's longtime ties to the elite private club Bailey's Beach have attracted scrutiny. The New York Times described the club as a haven for members of America's "ruling class" and various media outlets have said it has an all-white membership. In June 2021, Whitehouse defended his family's membership in the club. Asked whether the club had any nonwhite members, Whitehouse replied, "I think the people who are running the place are still working on that, and I'm sorry it hasn't happened yet." Asked whether such clubs should continue to exist, Whitehouse said, "It's a long tradition in Rhode Island." A spokesperson for Whitehouse said the club did not have any restrictive racial policies and that it had members of color. Whitehouse declined to provide details of the club's membership, and the club initially refused to answer questions about its policies or membership. The club ultimately put out a statement saying reports that its members were all-white were "inaccurate and false." The club's president urged members to use "restraint" when speaking to the media. Whitehouse said he would not ask his family members to resign from the club because "they are on the right side of pushing for improvements" and "my relationship with my family is not one in which I tell them what to do."

Whitehouse later acknowledged belonging to a Newport sailing club that he said lacked diversity, saying, "Failing to address the sailing club's lack of diversity is squarely on me, and something for which I am sorry."

Depictions in media
John Rothman portrayed Whitehouse in the 2019 film The Report.

Pete Davidson portrayed Whitehouse in the cold open of the season 44 premiere of Saturday Night Live.

References

External links

 Senator Sheldon Whitehouse official U.S. Senate website
 Campaign website
 
 

|-

|-

|-

|-

|-

|-

|-

1955 births
Living people
21st-century American politicians
American Episcopalians
American prosecutors
Democratic Party United States senators from Rhode Island
Dismissal of U.S. attorneys controversy
Episcopalians from Rhode Island
Lawyers from New York City
Lawyers from Providence, Rhode Island
Politicians from New York City
Politicians from Providence, Rhode Island
Rhode Island Attorneys General
Rhode Island Democrats
St. Paul's School (New Hampshire) alumni
United States Attorneys for the District of Rhode Island
University of Virginia School of Law alumni
Whitehouse family
Yale College alumni